Turbinicarpus gielsdorfianus is a species of plant in the family Cactaceae.

It is endemic to San Luis Potosí state in northeastern Mexico.

Its natural habitat is hot deserts.

It was thought to be extinct for some time until it was rediscovered. It is an Endangered species, threatened by habitat loss.

References

External links
 
 
 

gielsdorfianus
Cacti of Mexico
Endemic flora of Mexico
Flora of San Luis Potosí
Critically endangered plants
Endangered biota of Mexico
Taxonomy articles created by Polbot